Ancylometis ribesae is a species of moth in the family Oecophoridae. It is endemic to Réunion in the Indian Ocean, where it is very common.

It is of a very small size, approximately 4 by 8 mm.

References

Moths described in 1996
Oecophoridae
Moths of Réunion
Endemic fauna of Réunion